Peter O. Emelieze (born 19 April 1988) is an Olympic athlete, Nigerian German international sprinter who specializes in the 60m 100m and 200m.

He was born in Lagos. He reached the semi-final in 60 metres at the 2010 World Indoor Championships Doha,  Qatar.

He also participated at the Iaaf World Indoor Championship in 2012 in Istanbul, Turkey and also the World Athletics World indoor Championship in 2018 in Birmingham, United Kingdom.

His personal best times are 6.60 seconds in the 60 metres (indoor) achieved in February 2009 in Karlsruhe(GER) and Val-de-Reuil(FRA) in 2012 and 21.35 seconds in the 200 metres (indoor) achieved in February 2009 in Eaubonne(FRA)

 He has a personal best of 10.18 seconds in the 100 metres, achieved in August 2008 in Bottrop(GER) and in Weinheim(GER) in 2011. His best times are 20.97 seconds in the 200 metres achieved in Brasschaat in July 2008.

He is a 2 times African Champion in the  winning a gold medal at the African Athletics Championships in Mauritius 2006 and a silver medal in Port Novo Benin Republic in 2012.

He participated at the 100m metres event at the Olympic Games  in London in 2012 (United Kingdom) with a time of 10.22 seconds.

References

1988 births
Athletes (track and field) at the 2006 Commonwealth Games
Athletes (track and field) at the 2010 Commonwealth Games
Athletes (track and field) at the 2012 Summer Olympics
Nigerian male sprinters
German male sprinters
Sportspeople from Lagos
Living people
Nigerian emigrants to Germany
Olympic athletes of Nigeria
African Games medalists in athletics (track and field)
African Games gold medalists for Nigeria
Commonwealth Games competitors for Nigeria
Athletes (track and field) at the 2011 All-Africa Games
21st-century Nigerian people